European route E 576 is a secondary E-road found in northwestern Romania.

Route 
  (on shared signage  DN 1C)
Dej:  
Cluj-Napoca:  ,

External links 
 UN Economic Commission for Europe: Overall Map of E-road Network (2007)
 International E-road network

Roads in Romania